Lee Tae-young (born July 1, 1987) is a South Korean footballer.

External links 

1987 births
Living people
South Korean footballers
Pohang Steelers players
Qingdao Hainiu F.C. (1990) players
Chinese Super League players
K League 1 players
Korea National League players
Expatriate footballers in China
South Korean expatriate sportspeople in China
Expatriate footballers in Cambodia
Association football midfielders